The Tour d'Indre-et-Loire was a multi-day road bicycle race held annually from 1970 to 1982 in the department of Indre-et-Loire, France.

Winners

References

Cycle races in France
Recurring sporting events established in 1970
1970 establishments in France
Recurring sporting events disestablished in 1982
1982 disestablishments in France
Defunct cycling races in France
Indre-et-Loire